Bryan Barrett (born December 22, 1977) is a professional lacrosse player.

Barrett is a graduate of University of Delaware.   While at Delaware, his team was the 2000 Pre-Season All-American, named First Team All-American East in 2001, was the America East All-Tournament Team in 2001, and received an Inside Lacrosse Honorable Mention in 2000. He also served as team captain in 2000 and 2001.

Originally signed as a free agent by the Philadelphia Wings Barrett was traded to the New York Titans prior to the 2007 NLL season for a fourth round draft pick.

References

1977 births
Living people
American lacrosse players
Delaware Fightin' Blue Hens men's lacrosse players
Philadelphia Wings players
New York Titans (lacrosse) players
Orlando Titans players